Niš-Ekspres (full legal name: Akcionarsko društvo za saobraćajnu delatnost Niš-Ekspres Niš) is a bus company based in Niš, Serbia. Established in 1951, the company is today the largest and most-used public intercity transportation from Niš.

History
The company was established on 3 March 1951 as Preduzeće za putnički saobraćaj with a fleet composed of seven buses. It started its own bus production under the name Nibus in 1996. They developed their first model, tourist coach Nibus 350 powered by MAN engine. After five years of continuous development Nibus 350 evolved into Nibus 400. In 2006, Nibus 400 won the award “Best of Serbia”.

On 1 May 1999, a bus was struck by a NATO missile during the NATO bombing of Yugoslavia. The Niš-Ekspres bus was operating on the Niš-Priština line, which is no longer operated today. The BBC reported that 23 people were killed. In terrorist bombing on 16 February 2001, 12 civilians were killed while they were on a bus.

In October 2019, the company "Bokić Gojko" d.o.o. which is owned by company's general director Zoran Jovanović, became the majority shareholder of the company after purchasing nearly 50% of shares from Belgrade-based Delta Real Estate.

See also
 Transport in Serbia

References

External links

1951 establishments in Serbia
Bus companies of Serbia
Coach transport in Serbia
Companies based in Niš
Serbian brands
Transport companies established in 1951
Transport companies of Serbia